Heyrat (also Romanized as Ḩeyrat; also known as Ḩeyrat Kojūr) is a village in Panjak-e Rastaq Rural District, Kojur District, Nowshahr County, Mazandaran Province, Iran. At the 2006 census, its population was 255, in 78 families.

References 

Populated places in Nowshahr County